Gorbea is a Chilean city and commune located in Cautín Province, Araucanía Region.

Demographics
Of these, 9,413 (61.8%) lived in urban areas and 5,809 (38.2%) in rural areas. Between the 1992 and 2002 censuses, the population grew by 3.9% (570 persons).

Administration
As a commune, Gorbea is a third-level administrative division of Chile administered by a municipal council, headed by an alcalde who is directly elected every four years. The 2016-2020 alcalde is Guido Siegmund González (UDI).

Within the electoral divisions of Chile, Gorbea is represented in the Chamber of Deputies by René Manuel García (RN) and Fernando Meza (PRSD) as part of the 52nd electoral district, together with Cunco, Pucón, Curarrehue, Villarrica, Loncoche and Toltén. The commune is represented in the Senate by José Garcia Ruminot (RN) and Eugenio Tuma Zedan (PPD) as part of the 15th senatorial constituency (Araucanía-South).

Education
Previously the area had a German school, Deutsche Schule Gorbea.

References

External links
  Municipality of Gorbea

Communes of Chile
Populated places in Cautín Province
1887 establishments in Chile